David Lee (born 1944) is an American poet and the first poet laureate of the state of Utah. His  1999 collection News From Down to the Café was nominated for the Pulitzer Prize for Poetry and, in 2001, he was a finalist for the position of United States Poet Laureate. He has been acclaimed by the Utah Endowment for the Humanities as one of the twelve greatest writers to ever emerge from the state. A former farmer, he is the subject of the PBS documentary The Pig Poet. His poems have appeared widely in publications including Poetry, Ploughshares, The Missouri Review, Narrative Magazine, and JuxtaProse Literary Magazine. He has been cited as an influence on writers such as Lance Larsen and Bonnie Jo Campbell.

Life
Lee was born in Matador, Texas and graduated from [Colorado State University and took his PHD at Utah State University, for a current biography see Samara Press and Lees most recent book, “Rusty Barbed Wire” He published his first book of poetry, The Porcine Legacy, in 1974. Prior to his writing career he explored careers as a seminary student, pig farmer and boxer. He was also the last white athlete to play on a Negro league baseball team, and the only one to do so after the dissolution of the Texas Blue Stars. Lee earned his Ph.D. with a concentration in the poetry of John Milton and taught at Southern Utah University for three decades, where he served as Chairman of the Department of Language and Literature.

Awards and honors
Lee served as Utah's inaugural poet laureate from 1997-2002 and later received the Utah Governor’s Award for lifetime achievement in the arts. He is the recipient of the Mountains & Plains Booksellers Award in Poetry and the Western States Book Award in Poetry.  In 1999, his collection News From Down to the Café was nominated for the Pulitzer Prize for Poetry. In 2001, he was selected as a finalist for the position of United States Poet Laureate.
 His book So Quietly the Earth was among the 25 books chosen for the New York Public Library's 2004 "Books to Remember" list.

Selected works

Poetry
Porcine Legacy (Copper Canyon Press, 1974)

Shadow Weaver (Brooding Heron Press, 1984)
  (reprint 2004)
Day’s Work (Copper Canyon Press, 1990)
Paragonah Canyon (Brooding Heron Press, 1990)
My Town (Copper Canyon Press, 1995)
Covenants (with William Kloefkorn) (Spoon River Poetry Press, 1996)
Wayburne Pig (Brooding Heron Press, 1997)
The Fish (Wood Works Press, 1997)
Twenty-one Gun Salute (Grey Spider Press, 1999)
David Lee: A listener’s Guide’’ (Copper Canyon Press, 1999)Incident at Thompson Slough (Wood Works Press, 2002)So Quietly the Earth'' (Copper Canyon Press, 2004)

References

Jasmine Ellis, Granddaughter

External links
"About David Lee "
"David Lee Pitches Poetry", Raintaxi, Fall 1999
http://pigpoet.com/Pig_Poet/Home.html

1944 births
20th-century American poets
21st-century American poets
Washington and Lee University alumni
Southern Utah University faculty
Living people
Poets from Utah
Poets Laureate of Utah
People from Matador, Texas